The band-tailed nighthawk (Nyctiprogne leucopyga) is a species of nightjar in the family Caprimulgidae. It is found in Bolivia, Brazil, Colombia, Ecuador, French Guiana, Guyana, Paraguay, Peru, and Venezuela.
Its natural habitats are subtropical or tropical moist lowland forest, rivers, and swamps. They are most vocal during the night time, indicating that they are nocturnal birds. When they sing it has a very similar pitch to a frog's ribbit. This is most common during breeding season, which occurs from July until October.

References

band-tailed nighthawk
Birds of Colombia
Birds of Venezuela
Birds of the Amazon Basin
band-tailed nighthawk
Birds of Brazil
Taxonomy articles created by Polbot